German submarine U-314 was a Type VIIC U-boat of Nazi Germany's Kriegsmarine during World War II. The submarine was laid down on 9 June 1942 at the Flender Werke yard at Lübeck as yard number 314, launched on 17 April 1943 and commissioned on 10 June under the command of Kapitänleutnant Georg-Wilhelm Basse.

During her short career, the U-boat sailed on two combat patrols, but sank no ships before she was sunk on 30 January 1944. She was a member of four wolfpacks.

Design
German Type VIIC submarines were preceded by the shorter Type VIIB submarines. U-314 had a displacement of  when at the surface and  while submerged. She had two shafts and two  propellers.

U-314 was fitted with five  torpedo tubes (four fitted at the bow and one at the stern), fourteen torpedoes, one  SK C/35 naval gun, 220 rounds, and two twin  C/30 anti-aircraft guns. The boat had a complement of between forty-four and sixty.

Service history
The boat's service life began with training with the 8th U-boat Flotilla from June 1943. She was then transferred to the 11th flotilla for operations on 1 January 1944.

First patrol
U-314s first patrol took her to the Barents Sea, then south of Bear Island. She departed from Trondheim in Norway on 22 December 1943; the patrol finished at Hammerfest, northeast of Narvik, on 14 January 1944.

Second patrol and loss
The boat left Hammerfest on 25 January 1944.

Forty-nine men died; there were no survivors.

Wolfpacks
U-314 took part in four wolfpacks, namely:
 Eisenbart (24 December 1943 - 5 January 1944)
 Isegrim (5 – 13 January 1944)
 Isegrim (25 – 27 January 1944)
 Werwolf (27 – 30 January 1944)

See also
 Battle of the Atlantic (1939-1945)

References

Bibliography

External links

German Type VIIC submarines
U-boats commissioned in 1943
1943 ships
World War II submarines of Germany
Ships built in Lübeck
U-boats sunk by depth charges
Ships lost with all hands
U-boats sunk in 1944
U-boats sunk by British warships
World War II shipwrecks in the Arctic Ocean
Maritime incidents in January 1944